Events in Libya in 2022.

Incumbents
 President: Fayez al-Sarraj (until 15 March), Mohamed al-Menfi onwards
 Prime Minister: 
Abdul Hamid al-Dabaib (interim, starting 5 February)

Events
 17 May - 2022 Tripoli clashes begin 
 2 July - The House of Representatives building in Tobruk is stormed by protesters and burned down.

Sports

Deaths

See also

COVID-19 pandemic in Africa
2022 in North Africa
Government of Libya
Politics of Libya
Turkish military intervention in the Second Libyan Civil War
Slavery in Libya

References

 
Libya
Libya
2020s in Libya
Years of the 21st century in Libya